PeerStream (formerly SNAP Interactive) is an American computer software

On March 12, 2018, Snap Interactive, Inc. rebranded to PeerStream, Inc.(OTCQB:PEER). PeerStream is a developer of decentralized technologies for multimedia social apps and business communication.

On 14 May 2020, PeerStream, Inc. reported that the company's corporate name has been modified from "PeerStream, Inc." to "Paltalk, Inc.," effective Friday 15 May 2020, and that the Financial Industry Regulatory Authority ( FINRA) has authorized the shift of its ticker symbol from "PEER" to "PALT."

References

External links

Software companies based in New York City
Internet properties established in 2007
Software companies of the United States